Ibrahima Diallo (born 8 March 1999) is a French professional footballer who plays as a midfielder for Premier League club Southampton.

Club career

Early career 
Diallo is a graduate of the Monaco youth academy, joining them at the age of 15. Diallo joined Brest on loan in 2018. He made his professional debut with the club in a 1–1 (4–3) penalty shootout win in the Coupe de la Ligue over Sochaux on 14 August 2018.

Southampton 
On 4 October 2020, Diallo signed for Premier League club Southampton on a four-year contract, for an undisclosed fee. On 17 October 2020, Diallo made his first appearance for the club in a 3–3 draw against Chelsea, where he came off the bench to replace Oriol Romeu. His first Premier League start came in a 0–0 draw against Fulham on 26 December.

On 21 September 2021, Diallo scored his first professional goal, in the EFL Cup against Sheffield United which ended 2–2 at full time before Southampton advanced 4–2 on penalties.

Personal life
Diallo was born in France and is of Senegalese descent. His older brother Abdou is a footballer for RB Leipzig and the Senegal national team.

Career statistics

References

External links
 
 
 
 
 AS Monaco Profile

1999 births
Living people
Sportspeople from Tours, France
French footballers
France youth international footballers
France under-21 international footballers
Association football midfielders
Stade Brestois 29 players
AS Monaco FC players
Ligue 1 players
Ligue 2 players
Championnat National 2 players
Black French sportspeople
Southampton F.C. players
Premier League players
French expatriate footballers
Expatriate footballers in England
French expatriate sportspeople in England
French sportspeople of Senegalese descent
Footballers from Centre-Val de Loire